Noweco or Norwegian Welding Control AS is an industrial company based in Harstad and Hammerfest, Norway. It provides services related to the onshore and offshore industries. The company is owned by Norwegian Welding Company and its employees.

Services
It offers the following services:

Nondestructive testing
Consultancy on Welding technology, Quality Assurance and Inspection.
Technical and Financial Optimisation of Welding Processes.
Consultancy in connection with Tenders and Tender Conditions of Welding Work.
Accredited Certification of Welders.
Verification of Welding Procedures.

Approvals
Thickness measurement by DNV and Lloyd's Register amongst others.
Company approval in accordance with EN 729
Achilles

References
Some of the recent projects Noweco has been involved in:
Snøhvit
Ormen Lange

Engineering companies of Norway
Business services companies established in 1990
Companies based in Troms
Norwegian companies established in 1990